Cluny House is  Category B listed building in Aberfeldy, Perth and Kinross, Scotland. It dates to around 1825. Its tower was added about fifty years later.

In the mid-19th century, it was the home of Thomas Cockburn-Hood (1820–1889). 

The house's gardens were started in the 1950s by Bobby and Betty Masterton. The former also planted the tree trail at the Birks of Aberfeldy.

See also
List of listed buildings in Perth and Kinross

References

External links
Cluny House Gardens –  official website
Cluny House –  ParksandGardens.org
Cluny House –  Canmore

Category B listed buildings in Perth and Kinross
Buildings and structures in Perth and Kinross